Tan Hiep Hung Futsal Club (Vietnamese: câu lạc bộ futsal Tân Hiệp Hưng) is a Viet futsal club. They currently play in the Vietnam National Futsal League.

They hired coach Trương Hồng Tài for the 2019 season, but he was replaced by Trần Hoàng Vinh after a year.

Current squad

References

External links
Main Page

Futsal clubs in Vietnam
Futsal clubs established in 2008
2008 establishments in Vietnam